The American Classical Music Hall of Fame and Museum is a non-profit organization celebrating past and present individuals and institutions that have made significant contributions to classical music—"people who have contributed to American music and music in America", according to Samuel Adler (co-chairman of the organization's first artistic directorate). The project was founded in 1996 by Cincinnati businessman and civic leader David A. Klingshirm and inducted its first honorees in 1998.

The organization's offices and exhibits are housed in the Hamilton County Memorial Building, next door to the Cincinnati Music Hall in the Over-the-Rhine neighborhood of Cincinnati, Ohio. The exhibits are not open to the public but are on view during some events at the School for Creative and Performing Arts in Cincinnati and via a virtual museum. "The Classical Walk of Fame", pavement stones engraved with names of American Classical Music Hall of Fame inductees, was opened in Washington Park outside the steps of the Cincinnati Music Hall in 2012. A mobile app allows park visitors to read biographies of the inductees, listen to samples of their music, and view related pictures. They can also play classical music through a mobile jukebox which activates the park's "dancing fountain".

Inductees

1998

1999

2000

2001

2002

2003

2004

2005

2006

2007

2008

2009

2010

2011

2012

2013

2015

2017

2018

2019

See also
 List of music museums

References

External links

Museums in Cincinnati
Music
Music halls of fame
Music museums in Ohio
American music awards
Museums established in 1996
1996 establishments in Ohio
Music of Cincinnati
Over-the-Rhine
Classical music awards